Iustin Alin Popescu (born 1 September 1993) is a Romanian footballer who plays as a goalkeeper for Liga II club Concordia Chiajna.

Honours
Dinamo București
Cupa Ligii: 2016–17
Chindia Târgoviște
Liga II: 2018–19

References

External links
 
 

1993 births
Living people
Sportspeople from Craiova
Romanian footballers
Romania youth international footballers
Association football goalkeepers
Liga I players
Liga II players
Liga III players
AFC Chindia Târgoviște players
CS Unirea Tărlungeni players
FC Dinamo București players
FC Petrolul Ploiești players
CS Mioveni players
CS Concordia Chiajna players